Coleslaw is a salad made of raw cabbage.  It may also be
Cole Slaw, an album by Lou Donaldson
"Cole Slaw", also called "Sorghum Switch", a song by Jesse Stone
coleslaw cl, is a website Static Content Generator (blogware) for Common Lisp

See also
Cowlishaw (disambiguation)